XXY is a 2007 Argentine drama film written and directed by Lucía Puenzo and starring Ricardo Darín, Valeria Bertuccelli, Inés Efron and Martín Piroyansky. Based on the short story Cinismo (Cynicism), included in the book Chicos (Boys) by author Sergio Bizzio, the film tells the story of a 15-year-old intersex person, the way her family copes with her condition and the ultimate decision that she must eventually make as she struggles to define her own gender identity within a society that expects certain behaviors from every individual.

XXY received positive reviews from critics, winning the Critics' Week grand prize at the 2007 Cannes film festival, as well as the ACID/CCAS Support Award. It was nominated for eight awards at the 2008 Argentine Film Critics Association Awards, winning three of them including Best Film, and was nominated or won awards at a number of other foreign film festivals. It was chosen to close the 2008 Melbourne Queer Film Festival and had a short run theatrical release before being released onto DVD. The film also won the Goya Award for Best Spanish Language Foreign Film and the Golden Crow Pheasant at the International Film Festival of Kerala.

The film's title appears to be a reference to Klinefelter syndrome, a condition in which boys/men have an extra X chromosome. Males affected with Klinefelter syndrome often do not show highly-visible symptoms and are not aware of their condition, unless diagnosed later in life (usually due to infertility).  It can be ascertained throughout the film that the main character has typical female sexual characteristics, with the exception of an enlarged clitoris, although this is coupled with an apparent hormonal regimentation. This is inconsistent with the condition of 47XXY aka Klinefelter Syndrome, since those who have it are anatomically and biologically male.

Plot
Alex Kraken is a 15-year-old intersex person, born with both male and female genitals, who has been living and presenting herself as female and using medicines to suppress masculine features, such as a beard, and to attempt to have more feminine features. At the time of the movie, Alex has recently stopped taking her medication without telling her parents, which will cause her masculine features to begin to develop more.

Alex's parents moved with her from Argentina to a village by the sea in Uruguay, to avoid the society's discriminatory views and strict gender expectations. They wanted to help shelter her from bullying she was experiencing. Her father, Néstor Kraken, is a marine biologist who has written a book on sexuality and makes a living treating wounded animals found by fishermen. Her mother, Suli, invites friends from Argentina: a surgeon, his wife and teenage son Álvaro. The purpose, unknown to Néstor and Alex, is to discuss the possibilities of sex reassignment surgery, with Suli quietly hoping that Alex will decide to be female and go through with a surgery in the beginning.

The introduction of the relationship between Alex and Álvaro further complicates the drama of the movie. When Alex asks Álvaro directly if he would like to have sex, she is initially denied, but Álvaro later follows her from the beach and she seduces him. She begins to have anal intercourse with him (with her as the penetrative partner), and while Álvaro is surprised he does not stop Alex. Nestor catches sight of them through the door and they stop, and Alvaro rushes out feeling conflicted and still in a panic at the unexpected reversal in sexual roles. When Alex later apologizes, Álvaro reveals that he liked it and has no bad feelings towards her.

This scene opens the dialogue for the audience about gender roles and allows both characters, Alex and Álvaro, a chance to question their own identities and desires. Álvaro is raised by fairly conservative parents, and towards the end of the movie his father even expresses the desire that he hoped his son was not gay. However, Álvaro begins to question himself because he enjoyed the sexual experience with Alex even though Alex was performing anal sex on him. He is exploring his own gender and sexual identity within the confines of his parents' expectations, which contrasts with Alex's character who receives her parents' support about her situation.

At the same time, Alex is questioning her own decisions about her identity and is confronted with frustration at her own body and the limitations placed on her by society. After her father walks in on the sexual experience between his daughter and Alvaro, he realizes his child is now old enough to make her own decision about her life and her sexual identity, and seeks advice from a transgender man that he had read about in newspapers years before. The man expresses his appreciation that Alex's parents chose not to make the decision for her at birth by "castrating" her, and allowed her to make her own decision now. Alex's father is comforted by this conversation and returns to Alex recognizing that she is older now and must make her own decision.

Later in the movie, three boys from the village sexually assault Alex by forcibly pulling down her pants to see her genitals. Alex is embarrassed and ashamed by this encounter, perpetrated by the friends of Vando, her ex-friend and likely former romantic partner. Néstor realizes that reporting this to the police would cause the whole village to know about Alex's condition. However, Alex decides that it does not matter. Alex also decides that she does not want to resume taking medicines or have an operation. When asked by her father whether she wanted to choose to be either male or female, Alex replies "What if there is nothing to choose?".

Throughout the film there are multiple acknowledgements of the audience's curiosity about Alex's genitals. This is seen through the actions of other characters on screen, most notably the group of boys who assault Alex while she is on the beach. At the end of the film, Álvaro and his family are getting ready to board the boat to take them back to Buenos Aires. There is still tension between them after their last encounter in the woods. Álvaro walks away from his family to go sit behind a sea wall on the beach with Alex for a few moments. He shows her that he has started wearing the turtle tag that she had given him previously. He asks if he will ever see her again, and she tells him that she does not think that he will. They each admit to having fallen in love with each other, but when Alvaro tries to kiss Alex she pushes him away. Scarred from her experience on the beach with the three boys, she asks him if he regrets not seeing her again or not getting to see "it" more. She pushes down her pants to show Álvaro her genitals, and the audience watches Álvaro as he looks at Alex. The camera lingers on Álvaro's face as he looks at Alex's genitals and the audience is made aware the state of Alex's genitals will not be made known to them. Álvaro's father grabs him and Alex sits against the wall for a few moments crying before she returns to her family.

The ending shot is of Alex and her family leaving their guests at the boat and walking down the boardwalk. Alex grabs her father's hand and slings it across her shoulder before the camera pans to a shot of the ocean, focusing on the distant transitioning line between the sky and sea.

Cast
 Ricardo Darín as Néstor Kraken
 Valeria Bertuccelli as Suli Kraken
 Inés Efron as Alex Kraken
 Germán Palacios as Ramiro
 Martín Piroyansky as Álvaro
 Carolina Peleritti as Erika
 Guillermo Angelelli as Juan
 César Troncoso as Washington
 Jean Pierre Reguerraz as Esteban
 Ailín Salas as Roberta
 Luciano Martín Nóbile as Vando
 Lucas Escariz as Saul

Reception
The film received generally favorable reviews from critics. The film-critics aggregate Rotten Tomatoes reported 82% of critics gave the film a positive review based on 44 reviews, with an average score of 6.8/10. The critical consensus is: "This sharp directorial debut by Lucia Puenzo treats the challenging subject of intersex with intelligence and sensitivity." Metacritic, which assigns a standardized score out of 100, rated the film 67 based on 15 reviews, indicating "Generally favorable reviews." Roger Ebert gave the film 3.5 stars of out 4.

Ines Efron also received much critical acclaim for her performance in this film. Efron won the award for Best Actress at the Cartagena Film Festival as well as three other awards. She is also cited by Internet portal Ciudad.com.ar as "one of the most interesting arising actresses of Buenos Aires." She has been praised for depicting the character of Alex as a balanced combination of male and female, without leaning too far towards one or the other.

See also
 Klinefelter syndrome
 Intersex
 Hermaphrodite

References

External links
 
 
 
 
 Information about XXY and Klinefelter Syndrome

2007 films
2007 drama films
Argentine drama films
Argentine LGBT-related films
Spanish drama films
Spanish LGBT-related films
French drama films
French LGBT-related films
2000s Spanish-language films
Films about intersex
Films shot in Uruguay
Films set in Uruguay
Argentine independent films
Spanish independent films
French independent films
LGBT-related drama films
2007 LGBT-related films
2007 independent films
2000s French films
2000s Argentine films